Khadijeh Saqafi (1913 – 21 March 2009) was an Iranian revolutionary and the wife of Ruhollah Khomeini, the Supreme Leader of Iran and figurehead of the Iranian Revolution. In Iran, she was known as "the mother of the Islamic revolution".

Early life
Saqafi was born in 1913 in Tehran, the daughter of Hajj Mirza Mohammad Thaqafi-e Tehrani, a respected cleric and merchant.

Marriage and later years
Saqafi married Ruhollah Khomeini in 1929, when she was 15 and he was 27. They had seven children together, although only five survived childhood. The family resided in Qom until Khomeini's exile in 1964. Their son Mostafa died in Iraq in 1977 while in exile, while their second son Ahmad died of cardiac arrest in 1995. 

Throughout their marriage, Saqafi largely stayed out of the public eye, although she was described as being a strong supporter of her husband's opposition to Shah, Mohammad Reza Pahlavi. Akbar Hashemi Rafsanjani, former President of Iran, referred to Saqafi as the "closest and most patient" supporter of her husband.

Death
Saqafi died in Tehran on 21 March 2009 at the age of 95, following a long illness. Thousands attended her funeral at the University of Tehran, including Supreme Leader Ali Khamenei and then-President Mahmoud Ahmadinejad. Saqafi was buried next to her husband and son at his mausoleum in Behesht-e Zahra. She was survived by her three daughters Zahra, Sadiqeh, and Farideh.

References

External links

1913 births
2009 deaths
People of the Iranian Revolution
Ruhollah Khomeini
Burials at Behesht-e Zahra
Iranian revolutionaries
Wives of Supreme Leaders of Iran